Arthur Charles Wahl (September 8, 1917 – March 6, 2006) was an American chemist who, as a doctoral student of Glenn T. Seaborg at the University of California, Berkeley, first isolated plutonium in February 1941. He was a worker on the Manhattan Project in Los Alamos until 1946, when he joined Washington University in St. Louis. Beginning in 1952, he was the Henry V. Farr Professor of Radiochemistry; he received the American Chemical Society Award in Nuclear Chemistry in 1966 and retired in 1983. He moved back to Los Alamos in 1991 and continued his scientific writing until 2005. He died in 2006 of Parkinson's disease and pneumonia.

Further reading 
 Jeremy Bernstein: Plutonium: A History of the World's Most Dangerous Element. Cornell University Press, 2009.

References

External links 
 

1917 births
20th-century American chemists
2006 deaths
Iowa State University alumni
Manhattan Project people
University of California, Berkeley alumni
Washington University in St. Louis faculty